The Cyclocross Leuven is a cyclo-cross race held in Leuven, Belgium. It was first held on 30 December 2011 as a part of the Fidea Classics, replacing the Cyclocross Tervuren. Since the 2012–2013 season, it is part of the SOUDAL Classics. The track is located on the military domain next to the Hertogstraat in Heverlee, a deelgemeente of Leuven.

Podiums

Men

Women

References

Cycle races in Belgium
Cyclo-cross races
Sport in Leuven